() is a county-level district under the jurisdiction of Ningbo city in Zhejiang Province of the People's Republic of China.

Since the district has a drum tower (gulou) that was constructed during the Tang Dynasty, it is alternatively called "Haishu Lou". The district's total area is 29 square kilometers, and its population is 280,000 people. The district's postal code is 315000.  The district people's government is located at 229 Lingqiao Road.

Administrative regions
The district administers eight streets, 66 communities, and 16 administrative villages.

Street offices: Lingta Street, Yuehu Street, Gulou Street, Nanmen Street, Ximen Street, Baiyun Street, Duantang Street, and Wangchun Street.

Education
Ningbo University of Technology (previously Ningbo College) was formerly located in the district.

Tourist attractions
 Tashan Weir
 Yuehu Mosque

References

Geography of Ningbo
Districts of Zhejiang